Tedros "Teddy" Teclebrhan (born 1983) is a German comedian and actor, best known for his stand-up stage-comedy Teddy Comedy.

Biography 
Teclebrhan was born in Asmara, Eritrea in 1983 and was the youngest of three sons. He grew up in Mössingen, Germany. After the Zivildienst, he attended an international acting-academy, the CreArte in Stuttgart, from which he graduated in 2008.

Teclebrhan first appeared on television in 2009, where he played a Swabian gas station leaseholder in Laible und Frisch on the network SWR and a drug dealer from the Rhineland in Stolberg on the network ZDF.

In 2009, Teclebrhan had his stage debut in the musical Hairspray. From December 2009 to September 2010, he played the role of Seaweed J. Stubbs.

He first gained wide attention with the 2011 uploaded YouTube video Umfrage zum Integrationstest (was nicht gesendet wurde) ("Poll of integration test (outtakes)"), where he was first seen in his first self-created-role "Antoine". The video has gained over 42 million views as of November 2021.

In May 2012, his first videos of the stage program Teddy's Show were played on ZDFneo. The show contains stand-up comedy, a live band and a talk to guests. Next to Antoine, Teclebrhan also played new self-created characters there – "Percy", "Lohan Cohan", "Ernst Riedler" and "Ringo Fleischer".

In April 2012, he celebrated the premiere and start of his comedy-stage tour Teddy Show – Was labersch du…?! in Germany, Austria and Switzerland.

In 2013, he published the webseries Bootcamp on his YouTube channel TeddyComedy.

In the film  by director Christian Alvart, in 2014, Teclebrhan assumed a leading role on the side of Fahri Yardım and Sido.

Filmography 
Television
 2009–2010: Laible und Frisch
 2011: Stolberg
 2011–2014: Teddy's Show
 2012: Stuttgart Homicide – Tödliches Idyll
 2012: Und weg bist du
 2013: Lotta und die frohe Zukunft
 2015: Der Verlust
 2020: Bad Banks (TV series)

Film
 2006: Beles (short film)
 2007: The Roof is on Fire
 2007: Amselfeld (trailer)
 2009: Ebony & Ivory (short film)
 2010: Sascha
 2010: Kyra, Paris
 2012: Plötzlich 70!
 2013: Unter Feinden
 2014: Die Mamba
 2015: 
 2019: System Crasher

Theatre 
 2007: Ein ungleiches Paar as Manolo
 2008: Don Juan oder die Liebe zur Geometrie as Don Juan
 2007: Das Orchester as Leon
 2008: Schlafwagen Pegasus as an angel, a porter and rolling stone
 2008: Das lange Weihnachtsmahl as Charles
 2008: Der nackte Wahnsinn as Tim
 2009–2011: Hairspray (musical) as Seaweed
 2010: Love

Comedy 
 2011: Umfrage zum Integrationstest (short film) as a participant on a poll
 2012: Teddy Show – Tournee Süd (stage program with Teddy and band) as Teddy, Percy, Lohan Cohan and Antoine
 2011: Antoine's Traum (short film/documentary) as Antoine
 2013: Bootcamp as Antoine
 2013: Teddy Show – Deutschlandtournee (stage program with Teddy and Band) as Teddy, Percy, Lohan Cohan, Carlos and Antoine
 2014: Teddy Show – Deutschlandtournee (stage program with Teddy and Band) as Teddy, Ernst Riedler, Percy, Lohan Cohan, Carlos and Antoine
 2015: Teddy Show – Deutschlandtournee (stage program with Teddy and Band) as Teddy, Ernst Riedler, Percy, Lohan Cohan, Carlos and Antoine

References

External links 

 TeddyShow official website
  
 YouTube channel of Tedros Teclebrhan "TeddyComedy"
 Short biography and images
 Preview and voting of the ZDFneo program "Teddy's Show" 

1983 births
Living people
Actors from Baden-Württemberg
German male comedians
Eritrean emigrants to Germany
Eritrean actors
People from Asmara
People from Tübingen (district)
Swabian German language